Belvedere is a residential incorporated city located on the San Francisco Bay in Marin County, California, United States. Consisting of two islands and a lagoon, it is connected to the Tiburon Peninsula by two causeways. At the 2020 census, the population was 2,126. The per-capita (per person) income of Belvedere residents in the year 2000 was $250,000, but currently the average income is $283,000, making it one of the highest-income cities in California and the eighth highest-income community in the United States (highest with a population of over 1,000 residents). Belvedere and Tiburon share a post office and the 94920 ZIP code.

Location 

Belvedere's two islands are Belvedere Island and Corinthian Island. Corinthian Island is shared with Tiburon.

Belvedere Lagoon is situated between the two causeways (Beach Road and San Rafael Avenue) that connect Belvedere Island to the town of Tiburon.

History 
Belvedere incorporated as a city in 1896. Its first post office was opened in 1897.

Belvedere's City Hall was originally a Presbyterian Church. It was moved to its present location on San Rafael Avenue in 1949.

Actress Vivian Vance, who played Ethel on I Love Lucy, died in Belvedere in 1979 at the age of 70.

In 2017, Belvedere became a twin city with Portofino, Italy.

Houses 
Depending on where their homes are located, residents of Belvedere enjoy views of San Francisco, Angel Island, Sausalito, the Golden Gate Bridge, San Francisco and Richardson Bays, and Mount Tamalpais.

Houses on Belvedere and Corinthian Islands encompass a range of periods and architectural styles from Victorian to Mediterranean to post-and-beam "mid-century modern". Many are "cliff-hangers". Houses on the Belvedere Lagoon were designed by architects in the 1950s and 1960s. Houses on the lagoon have their own boat docks. Many of the homes on Belvedere and Corinthian Islands have docks with access to San Francisco Bay.

A number of Belvedere homes are listed on the National Register of Historic Places; e.g.,the Valentine Rey House  designed by Willis Polk  and built in 1893. Notable designers of homes in Belvedere have included Joseph Esherick, Albert Farr, who designed the Belvedere Land Company building and cottages, Henry Gutterson, and Charles Warren Callister.

New construction has become a contentious issue as residents have become frustrated with large projects that they believe are negatively affecting the character of the community. 
Belvedere is a residential community. The nearby town of Tiburon provides services, shops and eateries.

Two yacht clubs are located in Belvedere: the San Francisco Yacht Club and the Corinthian Yacht Club.

Demographics

2010
The 2010 United States Census reported that Belvedere had a population of 2,068. Population density was 859.2 people per square mile (331.7 per km2). 1,940 residents (93.8%) were White, 3 (0.1%) African-American, 58 (2.8%) Asian, 7 (0.3%) Pacific Islander, 18 (0.9%) from other races, and 42 (2.0%) from two or more races. 72 residents (3.5%) were Hispanic or Latino of any race.

There were 928 households. 228 (24.6%) had children under the age of 18 living in them, 542 (58.4%) were opposite-sex married couples living together, 54 (5.8%) had a female householder with no husband present, 15 (1.6%) had a male householder with no wife present.  There were 27 (2.9%) unmarried opposite-sex partnerships, and 6 (0.6%) same-sex married couples or partnerships.

276 households (29.7%) were made up of individuals, and 187 (20.2%) had someone living alone who was 65 years of age or older. The average household size was 2.23. There were 611 families (65.8% of all households); the average family size was 2.76.

443 residents (21.4%) were under the age of 18, 45 (2.2%) were aged 18 to 24, 277 13.4%) were aged 25 to 44, 650 (31.4%) were aged 45 to 64, and 653 (31.6%) were 65 years of age or older.  The median age was 54.0 years. For every 100 females, there were 80.9 males.  For every 100 females age 18 and over, there were 78.2 males.

There were 1,045 housing units, with an average density of 434.2 units per square mile (167.6 per km2), of which 695 (74.9%) were owner-occupied and 233 (25.1%) were occupied by renters. The homeowner vacancy rate was 2.1%; the rental vacancy rate was 4.5%. 1,614 residents (78.0% of the population) lived in owner-occupied housing units, and 454 residents (22.0%) lived in rental housing units.

Politics
As of January 2, 2018, Belvedere had 1,425 registered voters. Of these, 587 (41.2%) were registered as Democrats, while 416 (29.2%) were registered as Republicans. 371 (26.0%) declined to state. 51 were registered with other parties.

Twin City 
 Portofino, Liguria, Italy

Education 
Belvedere is in Reed Union School District.

See also

 List of people from Marin County, California

References

External links

Cities in Marin County, California
Cities in the San Francisco Bay Area
Incorporated cities and towns in California
Populated places established in 1896
Populated coastal places in California